Saccarina is a monotypic fossil genus of agglutinated benthic foraminifera described in 1969, belonging to the subfamily Saccorhizinae. It contains the sole species Saccarina bitubulifera. Its chronostratigraphic range is the Ludlovian, during the Upper Silurian.

References

Foraminifera genera
Tubothalamea